Giacomo Guardi (13 April 1764 – 3 November 1835) was an Italian painter from Venice. The son of famous veduta painter Francesco Guardi, he continued his father's line of work, though without the same level of renown. The majority of his works are quite small views of only minor artistic interest, more akin to postcards than to his father's grand scenes, but he produced several paintings showcasing a notable level of artistic skill as well. Evaluating his legacy is somewhat complicated due to the frequency with which paintings are misattributed to him.

References

1764 births
1835 deaths
18th-century Italian painters
Italian male painters
19th-century Italian painters
Painters from Venice
Italian vedutisti
19th-century Italian male artists
18th-century Italian male artists